Sonar Baran Pakhi is a 2016 Indian biographical film based on life of the Assamese folk singer Pratima Barua Pandey. The film was directed by Bobby Baruah Sarma. Sonar Baran Pakhi is the first Rajbangshi-language film. It was voted Best Feature Film at the Indian Film Festival of Los Angeles.

Cast
Pranami Bora as Old Pratima Barua Pandey
Pranjal Saikia	as Prakritish Baruah
Arati Baruah	as Old Pratima Barua Pandey
Kamal Priya Das as Pratima's mother
Susmita Ray as Kid Pratima Barua Pandey
Jagadish Deka as Ganga Sankar Pandey
Dhruba Jyoti Kumar as	Ritwik Ghatak
Nilim Chetiia as Bhupen Hazarika

References

External links

2016 films
Indian biographical films
Films set in Assam
2010s biographical films
2010s Assamese-language films